Walter Ariel Bou (born 25 August 1993) is an Argentine professional footballer who plays for Velez Sarsfield.

References

1993 births
Living people
Argentine footballers
Argentine expatriate footballers
People from Concordia, Entre Ríos
Sportspeople from Entre Ríos Province
Association football forwards
Club de Gimnasia y Esgrima La Plata footballers
Boca Juniors footballers
Esporte Clube Vitória players
Unión La Calera footballers
Unión de Santa Fe footballers
Defensa y Justicia footballers
Club Atlético Vélez Sarsfield footballers
Argentine Primera División players
Campeonato Brasileiro Série A players
Chilean Primera División players
Expatriate footballers in Chile
Expatriate footballers in Brazil
Argentine expatriate sportspeople in Chile
Argentine expatriate sportspeople in Brazil